Minions are an all-male species of fictional yellow creatures that appear in Illumination's Despicable Me franchise. They are characterized by their childlike behavior and their language, which is largely unintelligible.

The Minions serve as the official mascots for Illumination, and have also been described by The New York Times as "corporate icons" for Comcast in the years since their 2013 purchase of Illumination's parent company NBCUniversal; similar to Mickey Mouse for The Walt Disney Company, Bugs Bunny for Warner Bros. Discovery, SpongeBob SquarePants for Paramount Global, or Woody Woodpecker for Universal Pictures.

Kevin, Stuart, and Bob are three of the most familiar minions, who appear as stars in the film Minions (2015) and its sequel Minions: The Rise of Gru (2022). Many other Minions are mentioned by name in the films and other media in the franchise. They were created by art director Eric Guillon, who worked on several Illumination films.

Characteristics 
The Minions are small, yellow  capsule-shaped creatures with round gray glasses. They have one or two eyes, and their irises are almost always brown (except for Bob, who has one green and one brown eye). There appears to be no other difference between the two types beyond the number and color of eyes, and their height. They have no discernible noses but seem capable of smelling, as they are shown smelling fruit and are affected by the Fart Gun. They are also shown without ears but can hear and respond to sounds. Most Minions appear either bald or with a few wispy strands of black hair on their heads. After leaving their home country of Switzerland in favor of a new life in America during the late 1960s, their clothing consists of blue overalls emblazoned with Gru's logo, black rubber gloves, shoes, and goggles.

While shown as somewhat absent-minded and having very mischievous streaks, they also possess exceptional engineering abilities, being able to design and construct spaceships and playthings for Gru's adopted daughters, particularly the youngest, Agnes. Minions, the 2015 animated feature film, shows that they have existed since the beginning of life on Earth. Minions are biologically wired to seek out and serve the most terrible of villains; when they have no "boss" to serve, they become depressed and listless. They are also shown to have a degree of invulnerability, as Kevin, Stuart and Bob are able to survive a European torture chamber without any injuries, even playing with the torture devices. In the 2010 short film "Banana", the Minions are revealed to have an almost uncontrollable craving for fruit, especially bananas.

Language 
The Minions speak in a fictional polyglot language, called Minionese, which is partly derived from other languages, including French, English, Japanese, Korean, Italian, Spanish, and German. Although seemingly nonsensical, the English-sounding dialogue is dubbed differently for every country, in order to make the sounds somewhat recognizable.  They have common English-language names, such as Dave (one of the first known minions in the franchise), Kevin, Stuart, Bob (the lead trio in Minions and Minions: The Rise of Gru), Mel (the leader of the Minions in Despicable Me 3), and Otto (the fourth lead Minion in Minions: The Rise of Gru).

Derivatives 

Since the release of the Despicable Me films, the Minions' popularity has been rising. The Minions have been regularly featured in cross-promotions for other Comcast/NBCUniversal properties, including Universal theme parks, NBC primetime TV series and an Xfinity remote control.

"Minion versions" of the Simpson family appeared at the end of The Simpsons episode "Treehouse of Horror XXV", which aired on October 19, 2014.

The Minions appeared in three episodes of Family Guy. In "Inside Family Guy", which aired on October 23, 2016, Peter Griffin gets to take part in his true passion of weaving sexually explicit tapestries featuring the Minions. In "Peter's Lost Youth", which aired on March 26, 2017, to look like a big spender while on a baseball fantasy camp weekend with Lois Griffin, Peter offers to loan her his Minions Discover card. In "Bri, Robot" which aired on February 10, 2019, Peter gives Brian Griffin a DVD copy of Minions 3 for his birthday, in which Gru has been replaced by Harvey Weinstein. This cuts to Harvey facing a Minion. Peter also asks for a Minions cake for his birthday but insists that it come from the store.

In 2015, the village of Minions, Cornwall in the United Kingdom built a road sign paid for by Universal Studios featuring Minions. In October of that year, they removed it due to safety concerns that resulted from people stopping their cars to take photos although villagers have campaigned to get the sign put back up in another location.

On April Fool's Day 2016, Google created a button on its Gmail service that sent a "mic drop" along with a GIF image of a Minion. However, the feature received backlash in which many people complained about accidentally sending the image during job searches which resulted in some people being dropped from job consideration or being fired. Google removed the feature not long after, citing those reasons as well as a bug that caused the image to be sent after hitting the regular send button.

The Minions appeared in an advertisement for the Cinemark theater chain, in which several Minions try to change a lamp while another Minion mocks them. The mocking Minion drops the replacement lamp during one of his laughing fits so the others stick him in the socket so that his eye can serve as the lamp. The ad promoted the chain's claim that they had the brightest 3D projection system of any theater chain. At first, the clip played before showings of Despicable Me 2 (2013), but Cinemark uses the ad freely before any 3D film.

Three statues of Minions appear in Mortal Engines (2018), in which they are assumed to be idols of "ancient deities" from the time before the emergence of traction cities.

In Brazil, Minions were used as a reference to nickname the most devoted followers of politician Jair Bolsonaro, called by supporters of the left, in an ironic and offensive tone, "bolsominions". In an April 2016 "Extra" website article, journalist Felipe Pena compared Bolsonaro fans to Minions, saying that "they follow the leader, whom they call myth, and vent narcissistic repression by attacking the differences of groups they elect as rivals." Since then, the term has been widely used by the population in Brazilian and international media, across multiple languages, appearing in BBC, The Guardian, and Open Democracy articles.

Voice actors 
The Minions were voiced by Pierre Coffin, Chris Renaud, and Jemaine Clement in the first film. Coffin voiced Kevin, Tim, Bob, Mark, Phil, and Stuart, Renaud voiced Dave, and Clement voiced Jerry. Pierre Coffin and Chris Renaud later reprised their roles in Despicable Me 2, while Coffin assumed sole duties in Minions (2015), Despicable Me 3 (2017), and Minions: The Rise of Gru (2022).

 Pierre Coffin (2010–present) (all films)
 Chris Renaud (2010–2013) (Despicable Me and Despicable Me 2)
 Jemaine Clement (2010, Jerry only) (Despicable Me)

See also 
 List of mascots
 Servbot, a similar type of yellow childlike henchmen in video games developed and published by Capcom.

Notes

References 

Fictional species and races
Film characters introduced in 2010
Male characters in animation
Male characters in advertising
Mascots introduced in 2010
Film studio mascots
Despicable Me
Universal Pictures cartoons and characters
Fictional henchmen
Fictional immigrants to the United States
Corporate mascots
Internet memes
Film and television memes
Internet memes introduced in 2010
Animated characters introduced in 2010